William Robert Locke Spence, CBE, (9 October 1875 – 3 March 1954) was a British politician.

Born in Cockpen in Midlothian, Spence was educated at the Royal High School, Edinburgh.  When he was fifteen, he became an apprentice sailor, and joined the National Sailors' and Firemen's Union (NSFU).  He served in the Merchant Navy for many years, becoming an officer.  However, in 1911, he became a strong supporter of the sailors' case in the strike.  He resigned his commission, and devoted all his time to trade unionism.

In 1911, Spence began working full-time as an official of the NSFU, based on shore, initially in South Shields, and later in various ports in the south of England.  In 1928, he was elected as the union's general secretary, and from 1931 to 1941, he additionally served on the General Council of the Trades Union Congress.

Spence was made a Commander of the Order of the British Empire in 1937.  During World War II, he was a member of the Advisory Council to the Ministry of Shipping.  He retired in 1942, settling in Shoreham-by-Sea.

References

1875 births
1954 deaths
People from Midlothian
People educated at the Royal High School, Edinburgh
General Secretaries of the National Union of Seamen
Members of the General Council of the Trades Union Congress
Commanders of the Order of the British Empire